Pentachlaena vestita is a plant in the family Sarcolaenaceae. It is endemic to Madagascar. The specific epithet  is from the Latin meaning "blanketed", referring to the hairy indument on the underside of the leaves and also on stems, fruits and other surfaces.

Description
The inflorescences typically bear up two flowers, occasionally one flower, each with five sepals and five white petals.

Distribution and habitat
Pentachlaena vestita is known only from the central region of Amoron'i Mania. Its habitat is bushland or wooded grassland from  altitude.

Threats
Pentachlaena vestita is threatened by fires, some man-made, which stunt the plant's growth. The species is confined to a relatively small area. The preliminary status is Endangered.

References

Sarcolaenaceae
Endemic flora of Madagascar
Plants described in 2016